Aq Duz (also Romanized as Āq Dūz) is a village in Ilat-e Qaqazan-e Gharbi Rural District, Kuhin District, Qazvin County, Qazvin Province, Iran. At the 2006 census, its population was 35, in 9 families.

References 

Populated places in Qazvin County